Waheeda Rehman (born 3 February 1938) is an Indian actress and dancer who has appeared in mainly Hindi films, as well as Telugu, Tamil, Bengali and Malayalam films. She is noted for her contributions to different genres of films and different roles from the 1950s, 1960s and 1970s. Her accolades consist of a National Film Award,n 2 Filmfare Awards out of 9 nominations, the Filmfare Lifetime Achievement Award and the Centenary Award for Indian Film Personality. Throughout her career, she has been frequently cited as one of Bollywood's greatest, most influential and most beautiful actresses by various media outlets, titles for which she has received substantial publicity.

Although Rehman achieved her film debut in the Telugu film Rojulu Marayi (1955), she received recognition for her work in Hindi films directed by Guru Dutt, which included Pyaasa (1957), Kaagaz Ke Phool (1959), Chaudhvin Ka Chand (1960) and Sahib Bibi Aur Ghulam (1962), for which she received her first Filmfare nomination. She continued acting in the mid-1960s, starring in successful movies and establishing herself as one of the leading ladies in classic Indian cinema. Rehman's career reached its highest point when she won the Filmfare Award for Best Actress twice, for the Bollywood classic Guide (1965) and the romantic thriller Neel Kamal (1968) and received nominations for Ram Aur Shyam (1967) and Khamoshi (1969), the latter of which is considered to be her greatest performance ever.

Despite winning the National Film Award for Best Actress for portraying a clanswoman in love with a separate clansman in the commercial failure Reshma Aur Shera (1971), her career came to a standstill when she was reduced to motherly, supporting roles in films. Rehman's further notable performances are Kabhi Kabhie (1976), Namkeen (1982), Chandni (1989) and Lamhe (1991), and the latter film became her last film credit in the next 11 years until 2002, where she returned to the film industry.

In 2011, the Government of India honoured Rehman with the Padma Bhushan, the third-highest civilian award of the country. Apart from acting, Rehman is a philanthropist. She is an advocate for education and is an ambassador for Rang De, an organization combating poverty in India.

Films

References

Indian filmographies
Actress filmographies